The Wikipedia of Ripuarian languages is the Ripuarian edition of Wikipedia. It was started on July 6, 2005, as WiKoelsch on a private server, and was converted to an official Wikipedia during April 2006. As only about a million people speak the Ripuarian languages, the Ripuarian Wikipedia is relatively small. Since both the use of Ripuarian, and the population capable of using a Ripuarian language, are decreasing, it is also an endangered language Wikipedia.

History

Preparation phase 
The first discussions about a Wikipedia in Colognian in the first place, or all Ripuarian languages on second thought, started 2004 in the German Wikipedia.
Ripuarian languages are spoken mainly in the District Cologne in the South-West of North Rhine-Westphalia in Germany and smaller adjacent areas in Rhineland-Palatinate, Belgium, and the Netherlands.
The WiKoelsch Logo
During the first half of 2005, the idea condensed and a first small group of contributors were willing to try it. One of them installed MediaWiki on his own server and made it available under the domain wikoelsch.dergruenepunk.de for everyone willing to contribute to it at July 6, 2005. After a phase of initial silence, slightly more than 1000 pages were created in the remainder of the year. Roughly half of them were stub pages and disambiguation pages, for instance about abbreviations.

In September 2004 already, a request had been made to create a Wikipedia for Ripuarian languages, which spurred a discussion which finally led to the acceptance of the proposal by the Wikimedia Foundations board of trustees two days before Christmas in the same year.
Although the Wikipedia is dedicated to all Ripuarian languages, it was - pars pro toto - to be created with the identifyer ksh for the wiki and interlanguage links to it. That was a SIL code, which was later to become an ISO 639-3 code. It refers solely to the Colognian language, the biggest and best documented  Ripuarian variety. The ISO 639 joint advisory committee had refused to add ksh to the ISO 639-2, and to create a code for the Ripuarian group at that time.

On March 24, 2005, the new wiki was set up under the domain ksh.wikipedia.org.

Transition 
When the new wiki was created on the server cluster of the Wikimedia Foundation under the domain ksh.wikipedia.org and was going to be used, a series of outages of the test website delayed copying content from there. Also, it was not possible to transfer data directly from one SQL server to the other, thus the newly developed page export and import feature of MediaWiki had to be used. Several bugs and deficiencies  were detected during the process and had to be overcome. Since it was not possible to transfer user accounts and passwords, a volunteer developed and hosted a dual login web page allowing to supply two username/password pairs which were automatically verified against either wiki. If successful, a public list of user name pairs was updated, so the user continuity and proper attribution was guaranteed. Towards the end of April, 2006, the Wikipedia became eventually usable with page data and its history,
but cleaning up various remains of the problems left behind by the transition took several more months.

The WiKoelsch wiki was kept online for quite a while. It went offline as late as early fall 2007. It is but to some degree available in the Internet Archive.

Wikipedia 
Though a Colognian localization of MediaWiki had already been begun during the preparation phase, it was incomplete and had in part become outdated. With the advent of the Wikipedia, a new move was made to continue collaboratively; initially in the German Wikipedia  and later, since mid-2006, in the Ripuarian one. Although it had been planned to provide at least two varieties of Ripuarian, that did not work out due to a series of mishaps. In the last days of August, 2006, only one of the localizations went online.

Towards the end of the year 2006, a series of harsh and in part unnecessarily personal arguments were held about the spellings in the Wikipedia of Ripuarian languages. They led to almost two months of edit-warring  and an apparently non-serious proposal of a Colognian-only Wikipedia. In early 2007 some regular, productive contributors withdrew.

On January 9, 2009, the ksh Wikipedia was mentioned in an own short article in a local newspaper.

Statistics 
There are  articles on this edition of Wikipedia and a total of  pages.
  total edits were made.
 There are  registered users, including  active users and  administrators.

References

External links 

  Wikipedia of Ripuarian languages
  mobile version of the Wikipedia of Ripuarian languages (not fully supported)

Ripuarian
Internet properties established in 2005
Wikipedia
German-language encyclopedias
Wikipedias in Germanic languages